Bryotropha basaltinella is a moth of the family Gelechiidae. It is found in Great Britain, the Benelux, Germany, France, Spain, Switzerland, Austria, Hungary, Slovakia, the Czech Republic and Poland.

The wingspan is 11–12 mm. The forewings are dark grey-brown with a distinct ochreous basal spot followed by blackish blotches on the costa and tornus. The hindwings are pale fuscous, but darker towards the apex. Adults are on wing from May to September in one generation per year.

The larvae feed on various mosses. They live in a densely spun silken tube beneath the surface of the host plant. The larvae have a dull purplish brown body. They can be found in spring.

References

Moths described in 1839
basaltinella
Moths of Europe